Herbert Feis (June 7, 1893 – March 2, 1972) was an American historian, author, and economist who was the Economic Advisor for International Affairs to the US Department of State in the Herbert Hoover and Franklin Roosevelt administrations.

Feis wrote at least 13 published books and won the annual Pulitzer Prize for History in 1961 for one of them, Between War and Peace: The Potsdam Conference (Princeton University Press, 1960)., which features the Potsdam Conference and the origins of the Cold War.

Early life
Feis was born in New York City and raised on the Lower East Side. His parents, Louis Feis and Louise Waterman Feis, were Jewish immigrants from Alsace, France, who came to America in the late 1800s. His uncle invented the Waterman stove. He graduated from Harvard College and went on to marry Ruth Stanley-Brown, the granddaughter of US President James Garfield; they had a daughter.

Career
Feis was an instructor at Harvard University (1920–1921), an associate professor of economics at the University of Kansas (1922–1925), and a professor and department head at the University of Cincinnati (1926–1929). He published a stream of scholarly studies. From 1922 to 1927, he was also an adviser on the American economy to the International Labor Office (ILO) of the League of Nations, in Geneva, Switzerland. He was on the staff of the Council on Foreign Relations from 1930 to 1931.  His first major book, Europe, the World's Banker, 1870-1914 (1930), impressed  Secretary of State Henry L. Stimson, who recruited Feis to the State Department, where Feis was an economic advisor 1931 to 1943 and helped shape the nation's international economic policies and represented his government at  numerous international conferences including the World Economic and Monetary Conference of 1933 in London and the meetings of the Conference of American Republics held in Buenos Aires (1936), Lima (1938), and Panama (1939). He served as a senior advisor in the War Department from 1943 to 1947.  He then wrote 11 major monographs over the next 25 years that provide a comprehensive history of American foreign policy from 1933 to 1950. He had access to secret documents as well as his own memories to trace the convoluted course that Washington followed in abandoning its traditional isolationism for a policy of global intervention. His books comprised the "orthodox" interpretation of history. His analysis of the origins of the Cold War was challenged from the left during the Vietnam era, with the allegation that the Hiroshima and Nagasaki bombings were designed primarily to stop Soviet expansionism and thus caused the Cold War. However, scholarship since the 1980s has largely vindicated his interpretation of the use of nuclear weapons in 1945 as an effort to end the bloodshed as fast as possible.

Criticism
According to the Dictionary of American Biography:
Feis was not without his critics. Some charged that as a "court historian" he could not write objectively about the government policies and actions that he himself had helped to formulate. His close involvement with the people and events about which he wrote, they said, "shackled" him to an "establishment line." One English critic described his 1960 prize-winning study of the Potsdam Conference as "a State Department brief, translated into terms of historical scholarship." But the dominant view was that while Feis's participation in events animated his narrative, he wrote objective history characterized by reasonably dispassionate analysis. As an insider with access to government documents closed to other scholars, he had an unusual advantage, a fact of which he was well aware. Perhaps because of this, he devoted much time during the 1960s trying to persuade government officials that they could open government documents to research scholars much sooner than was customary without jeopardizing the national security.

Legacy

The Herbert Feis Award is awarded annually since 1984 by the American Historical Association, a major professional society of historians, to recognize the recent work of public historians or independent scholars.

Bibliography
 The Settlement of Wage Disputes (Macmillan, 1921) – his earliest work in the Library of Congress Catalog
 Europe the World's Banker, 1870-1914: an account of European foreign investment and the connection of world finance with diplomacy before the war (1930) online
 The Changing Pattern of International Economic Affairs (1940)
 Seen from E.A.: Three International Episodes (1947) online
 The Spanish Story: Franco and the Nations at War (1948) online
 The Road to Pearl Harbor: The Coming of the War Between the United States and Japan (1950) online 
 The China Tangle: The American Effort in China from Pearl Harbor to the Marshall Mission (1953) online
 Churchill, Roosevelt, Stalin: The War They Waged and the Peace They Sought (1957) 
 Between War and Peace: The Potsdam Conference (1960) (Pulitzer Prize) online
 Japan Subdued: The Atomic Bomb and the End of the War in the Pacific (1961) The Atomic Bomb and the End of World War II (1966)
 1933: Characters in Crisis (1966)
 Contest over Japan (1967)
 The Birth of Israel (1969)
 From Trust to Terror: The Onset of the Cold War, 1945–1950 (1970)

See also

References

Sources
 Crapol, Edward. "Some reflections on the historiography of the cold war." The History Teacher 20.2 (1987): 251-262. online
 Doenecke, Justus. "Feis, Herbert" American National Biography online
 Goldberg, Stanley. "Racing to the Finish: The Decision to Bomb Hiroshima and Nagasaki." Journal of American-East Asian Relations (1995): 117-128. online
 Kort, Michael. "The Historiography of Hiroshima: The Rise and Fall of Revisionism." New England Journal of History 64.1 (2007): 31-48. online
 
 "Herbert Feis." Dictionary of American Biography,'' (Charles Scribner's Sons, 1994). online

External links
 
 
 
 

1893 births
1972 deaths
People from the Lower East Side
American people of French-Jewish descent
20th-century American historians
American male non-fiction writers
Jewish American historians
Cold War historians
Public historians
Pulitzer Prize for History winners
Writers from Manhattan
Harvard College alumni
Historians from New York (state)
20th-century American male writers
20th-century American Jews